Bouville is a commune in the Seine-Maritime department in the Normandy region in northern France.

Heraldry

Population

Places of interest
 The church of Notre-Dame, dating from the twelfth century.
 Remains of a sixteenth-century castle.
 A fifteenth century cross.

See also
Communes of the Seine-Maritime department

References

External links

Bouville on the Quid website 

Communes of Seine-Maritime